Strophioblachia is a genus of plants in the family Euphorbiaceae first described as a genus in 1900. It contains only one known species, Strophioblachia fimbricalyx, native to southern China (Yunnan, Guangxi), E Indochina (Vietnam, Cambodia, Thailand), the Philippines, and Sulawesi.

References

Codiaeae
Monotypic Euphorbiaceae genera
Flora of Asia
Taxa named by Jacob Gijsbert Boerlage